The Mona Lisa's Sister is a 1988 album by Graham Parker. It was Parker's first album for RCA following an acrimonious split with Atlantic and the first he produced himself (with Brinsley Schwarz). The "stripped-down" sound of the album garnered critical acclaim and presaged a back-to-basics trend in rock music in the 1990s. It was re-released by Buddah Records in 1999 with a bonus track, "Ordinary Girl", the B-side to "Get Started. Start a Fire". The album debuted at #132 on Billboard 200 Album chart on 28 May 1988, peaking at #77.

In 1989, it was ranked #97 on Rolling Stone magazine's list of the 100 best albums of the 1980s.

Track listing
All song by Graham Parker except (11)

 "Don't Let It Break You Down"  – 3:34
 "Under the Mask of Happiness"  – 3:34
 "Back in Time"  – 3:24
 "I'm Just Your Man"  – 3:41
 "OK Hieronymus"  – 4:15
 "Get Started. Start a Fire"  – 5:08
 "The Girl Isn't Ready"  – 3:32
 "Blue Highways"  – 2:35
 "Success"  – 3:48
 "I Don't Know"  – 2:47
 "Cupid" - (Sam Cooke)  – 2:30

Bonus track – 1999 Buddha re-release
 "Ordinary Girl"

Bonus tracks – 2016 Expanded Edition
 "Ordinary Girl"
 "Durban Poison"
 "Burning on a Higher Flame"
 "There's a Ghost in My House"

Charts

Personnel
Graham Parker - lead and backing vocals, acoustic guitar, producer
Brinsley Schwarz - electric guitar, backing vocals, percussion, producer
Andrew Bodnar - bass guitar
James Hallawell - keyboards
Terry Williams - drums
Pete Thomas - drums on (4) and (7)
Andy Duncan - drums on (9)
Christie Chapman - backing vocals
Technical
Jon Jacobs - engineer
Martin Edwards - assistant engineer
Jack Drummond - cover painting
Jolie Parker - photographs

Notes 

Graham Parker albums
1988 albums
RCA Records albums